For the actor, see David Dorfman, and for the screenwriter, see David S. Dorfman

David Dorfman (born 1955) is a dancer, choreographer, musician, activist and teacher.  A native of Chicago, he received his bachelor of science in business administration degree in 1977 from Olin Business School at Washington University in St. Louis. In 1981, he received his MFA in dance from Connecticut College in New London, Connecticut, where he is regularly the chairperson of the department of dance, having joined the faculty in 2004.  In 1985 he founded his company David Dorfman Dance, one of the nation's leading modern dance companies.  He received a Guggenheim Fellowship in 2005 to continue his research and choreography in the topics of power and powerlessness, including activism, dissidence and underground movements. He has also been awarded four fellowships from the National Endowment for the Arts, three New York Foundation for the Arts fellowships, an American Choreographer's Award, the first Paul Taylor Fellowship from The Yard, and a 1996 New York Dance & Performance Award ("Bessie").

His choreography has been produced in New York City at venues ranging from Lincoln Center Out of Doors and the BAM Next Wave Festival to The Kitchen, the Joyce Theater, Dance Theater Workshop, Danspace Project/St. Mark's Church, P.S. 122 and Dancing in the Streets. His work has been commissioned widely in the U.S. and in Europe, most recently by Bedlam Dance Company (London), d9 Dance Collective (Seattle), and the Prince Music Theater in Philadelphia for the musical Green Violin, for which he won a 2003 Barrymore Award for best choreography.

Dorfman was the recipient of a 2010 Whalie Award (southeastern Connecticut music awards) for the best hip hop/rap group for his work with the band, as well as a 2011 Whalie for Album of the Year for the release Two Sides.

In 2017, Dorfman made his Broadway debut as choreographer of Paula Vogel's play Indecent, which was nominated for three Tony Awards, including the Tony Award for Best Play.

In addition to his work in dance, Dorfman also performs with the New London-based hip hop band Above/Below, playing baritone saxophone.

Works
 Prophets of Funk - Dance to the Music, using the music of Sly and the Family Stone
 Disavowal, which examines the life and legacy of abolitionist and (in)famous "race traitor" John Brown
 underground, inspired by a documentary on the Weathermen
 Older Testaments, to music by composer/trumpeter Frank London of The Klezmatics
 Lightbulb Theory and Impending Joy
 See Level, the company's first evening-length work
 To Lie Tenderly and Subverse
 A Cure for Gravity, set to music by popular composer and recording artist Joe Jackson

References

External links
 David Dorfman Dance Company
 Archival footage of David Dorfman Dance Company performing in Prophets of Funk in 2011 at Jacob's Pillow Dance Festival
 Dorfman Faculty Profile
 Above/Below bandcamp page
 Interview with Zouch Magazine

American male dancers
1956 births
American choreographers
Living people
Artists from Chicago
Olin Business School (Washington University) alumni
Connecticut College alumni
Washington University in St. Louis alumni